Woodrow is an unincorporated community in Millard County, in the U.S. state of Utah.

History
A post office called Woodrow was established in 1913, and remained in operation until 1915. The community was named after Woodrow Wilson, 28th President of the United States.

References

Unincorporated communities in Millard County, Utah
Unincorporated communities in Utah
Great Basin National Heritage Area